= NVPI =

Netherlands recording industry trade organization

- The logo of NVPI
- Formation: 1973; 53 years ago
- Location: Amsterdam, Netherlands
- Region served: Netherlands
- Website: nvpi.nl

NVPI (Nederlandse Vereniging van Producenten en Importeurs van beeld- en geluidsdragers) (English: The Dutch Association of Producers and Importers of image- and sound-carriers) is the Dutch trade association of the entertainment industry. The NVPI represents most of the Dutch record companies, video distributors, and game-software distributors.

== History ==
The NVPI is found in 1973 as a representative of the record-companies in the Netherlands. In 1983 video-film distributors were included in the association and in 1996 the producers of entertainment software. Every division has its own board. The three divisions form a federation. The NVPI represents both major and small independent producers. The (board) structure guarantees influence by every included company.

The NVPI represents (looked at the total volume of trade) approximately 85% of the record companies, 80% of the video-film companies, and 50% of the entertainment software. NVPI is included with the international organization IFPI (International Federation of the Phonographic Industry), IVF (International Video Federation), and the ISFE (Interactive Software Federation Europe).

== Core branches ==
The core branches of NVPI are:

- Lobbying
- Announcements to the press and others
- Market investigation
- Representation in consultative bodies
- Distribution of Home copying compensation to audio producers
- Cultural/social activities
- Information to its members

== Certifications ==
Since 1 January 2024, NVPI certifies only singles and albums. Certification is based on the number of streams, including paid and ad-supported streaming, but excluding free streams such as YouTube and social media. Diamond certifications are only awarded to recordings which were not awarded multi-platinum awards in the past.

Single downloads are counted at a rate of one download being equivalent to 215 streams for singles. The certification levels for popular music singles are as follows:

- Gold: 10,000,000
- Platinum: 20,000,000
- Diamond: 50,000,000

For album certifications, the album must include at least five tracks and only tracks which did not appear on previous albums are counted. A full album download or physical sale counts as 2,150 streams. The certification levels for popular music albums are as follows:

- Gold: 40,000,000
- Platinum: 80,000,000
- Diamond: 200,000,000

The certification levels for jazz and classic music are half the ones for popular music.

=== Historical certification ===
Prior to 2024, NVPI awarded certifications to albums, singles, DVDs and entertainment software. Certifications for music recordings began in 1978. The following levels were used over the years:

==== Popular music albums ====
Certification	Since January 1, 1978	Since January 1, 2000	Since January 1, 2006	Since January 1, 2008	Since June 1, 2009	Since July 1, 2014
Gold	50,000	40,000	35,000	30,000	25,000	20,000
Platinum	100,000	80,000	70,000	60,000	50,000	40,000

==== Classical music albums ====
Includes jazz and world music.

Certification	Since January 1, 1978	Since January 1, 2008
Gold	15,000	10,000
Platinum	25,000	20,000

==== Singles ====
Certification	Since January 1, 1978	Since January 1, 1984	Since January 1, 1992	Since January 1, 2000	Since January 1, 2008	Since June 1, 2009	Since July 1, 2014	Since April 1, 2016	Since January 1, 2018
Gold	100,000	75,000	50,000	40,000	25,000	10,000	15,000	20,000	40,000
Platinum	150,000	100,000	75,000	60,000	50,000	20,000	30,000	40,000	80,000

==== DVDs ====
Certification	Since January 1, 2006	Since January 1, 2008	Since June 1, 2009	Since October 1, 2015
Gold	40,000	30,000	25,000	7,500
Platinum	80,000	60,000	50,000	15,000

==== Entertainment software ====
Games were certified separately for each gaming carrier (PlayStation/Xbox/GameCube/Nintendo/PC).

Certification	Games	Non-games
Gold	40,000	7,500
Platinum	80,000	15,000

== Charts ==
NVPI works with two different chart organizations in the Netherlands. Those are the Dutch Top 40 (a weekly singles chart including downloads, single sales and radio airplay) and MegaCharts (weekly charts of the Album Top 100, Single Top 100, Music DVD Top 30 and several others).

== See also ==
- IFPI
